Eriksen is a common  Danish and Norwegian patronymic surname meaning "son of Erik", itself an Old Norse given name. The spelling forms Ericksen,  Erichsen, Ericson, Erikzen, are cognates. People with the surname Eriksen and its cognates include:

Eriksen 
 Adam Eriksen (1852–1931), Norwegian painter
 Beate Eriksen (born 1960), Norwegian actress and film director
 Birger Eriksen (1875–1958), Norwegian military officer
 Brett Eriksen, American musician
 Bruce Eriksen (1928–1997), Canadian artist and social activist
 Christian Eriksen, (born 1992), Danish footballer
 Dagrun Eriksen (born 1971), Norwegian politician
 Edvard Eriksen (1876–1959), Danish-Icelandic sculptor
 Eivind Kristoffer Eriksen (1893–1949), Norwegian politician
 Eline Eriksen, Danish model for the Little Mermaid statue in Copenhagen, Denmark
 Erik Eriksen (1902–1972), Prime Minister of Denmark
 Harald Eriksen (gymnast) (1888–1968), Norwegian gymnast
 Hege R. Eriksen Norwegian professor
 Inge Eriksen (1935–2015), Danish writer and political activist
 Ingvald Eriksen (1884–1961), Danish gymnast
 Ivar Eriksen (born 1942), Norwegian speed skater
 Jens Eriksen (born 1969), Danish badminton player
 John Eriksen (1957–2002), Danish footballer
 Kaj-Erik Eriksen (born 1979), Canadian television actor
 Lars-Erik Eriksen (born 1954), Norwegian cross country skier
 Louise Eriksen (born 1995), Danish footballer
 Mads Eriksen (born 1977), Norwegian cartoonist
 Marius Eriksen (1886 - ?), Norwegian gymnast
 Nils Eriksen (1911–1975), Norwegian footballer
 Odd Eriksen (born 1955), Norwegian politician
 Olle Johan Eriksen (1923–1999), Norwegian politician
 Preben Eriksen (born 1958), Danish speedway rider
 Rita Eriksen (born 1966), Norwegian singer
 Rosa Eriksen (born 1990), Danish politician
 Rune Eriksen (born 1974), Norwegian musician
 Stein Eriksen (1927–2015), Norwegian-American alpine skier
 Synnoeve Eriksen (born 1963), Norwegian novelist
 Thomas Bruun Eriksen (born 1979), Danish road bicycle racer
 Thomas Hylland Eriksen (born 1962), Norwegian professor
 Torun Eriksen, Norwegian singer

Ericksen

Andy Ericksen (1894–1973), Australian rules footballer
Bruce Werner Ericksen, an alias used by American bank robber and con man, Benjamin Hoskins Paddock
Charles Ericksen 1875–1916), Norwegian-American wrestler
Doug Ericksen (1969–2021), American politician
E. E. Ericksen (1882–1967), American philosopher
Joan N. Ericksen (born 1954), American judge
Robert Ericksen, Holocaust historian

Erichsen 
 Bente Erichsen (born 1949), Norwegian culture director
 Eivind Erichsen (1917–2005), Norwegian economist
 Fie Udby Erichsen (born 1985), Danish rower
Freja Beha Erichsen (born 1987), Danish model 
 John Eric Erichsen (1818–1896), Danish-born British surgeon
 Ludvig Mylius-Erichsen (1872–1907), Danish explorer of the Arctic
 Tinius Nagell-Erichsen (1934–2007), Norwegian publisher

Fictional characters
 Marshall Eriksen, fictional character in the American TV series How I Met Your Mother, played by actor Jason Segel

See also 
Erik
Erikson
Eriksson
Ericsson (disambiguation)
Erickson (disambiguation)

Danish-language surnames
Norwegian-language surnames
Patronymic surnames
Surnames from given names